Ron Field (October 18, 1933 – February 6, 1989) was an American choreographer, dancer, and director.

Life and career 
Field was born in New York City, New York where he made his Broadway debut as a child in Lady in the Dark (1941) with Gertrude Lawrence. He later danced in the ensembles of Gentlemen Prefer Blondes (1949), Kismet (1954), and The Boy Friend (1955) before deciding to concentrate on choreography.  His first two efforts Nowhere But Up (1962) and Cafe Crown (1964) were unsuccessful, but in 1966 he won his first Tony Award for his dazzling work in the hit Cabaret, the first of several noteworthy successes.

During rehearsals for Stephen Sondheim's trouble-plagued Merrily We Roll Along in 1981, Field was dismissed from the creative team.

It wasn't until a revival of Cabaret in 1987 that he would have another Broadway success.

In addition to his work on Broadway, Field staged such diverse projects as Las Vegas nightclub acts, the 44th Annual Academy Awards telecast in 1972, Pinocchio (a 1976 TV special starring Sandy Duncan), a Hollywood Bowl concert and television special with Bette Midler in 1977, the opening ceremonies for the 1984 Los Angeles Olympics,  and an acclaimed revival of Kiss Me, Kate  in London's West End. He also choreographed Martin Scorsese's New York, New York (1977).

On February 6, 1989, Field died of brain lesions in New York City at the age of fifty-five.

Stage credits 
1987 Cabaret (Choreography)
1986 Rags (Choreography)
1980 Perfectly Frank (Choreography)
1978 King of Hearts (Choreography and Direction)
1971 On the Town (Choreography and Direction)
1970 Applause (Choreography and Direction)
1968 Zorba (Choreography)
1966 Cabaret (Choreography)
1964 Cafe Crown (Choreography)
1962 Nowhere to Go But Up (Choreography)

Awards and nominations 
Awards
1967 Tony Award for Best Choreography – Cabaret
1970 Tony Award for Best Choreography – Applause
1970 Tony Award for Best Direction of a Musical – Applause
1977 Emmy Award for Outstanding Choreography – America Salutes Richard Rodgers: The Sound of His Music
1978 Emmy Award for Outstanding Choreography – The Sentry Collection Presents Ben Vereen: His Roots
Nominations
1969 Tony Award for Best Choreography – Zorba
1973 Emmy Award for Outstanding Directing in a Comedy, Variety or Music – Once Upon a Mattress
1980 Emmy Award for Outstanding Choreography – Baryshnikov on Broadway
1987 Tony Award for Best Choreography – Rags

References

External links 
 
 
 

1934 births
1989 deaths
American musical theatre directors
American choreographers
Drama Desk Award winners
Primetime Emmy Award winners
Tony Award winners